Rinorea longistipulata is a species of plant in the Violaceae family. It is endemic to Brazil.

References

Endemic flora of Brazil
longistipulata
Vulnerable plants
Taxonomy articles created by Polbot